Censurado is an album by Ranking Stone. Peaked as #4 at Billboard Tropical Albums and #36 at Billboard Top Latin Albums.

Track listing
 "Intro"
 "Cuando"
 "Dale Mai" (featuring Cheka)
 "Quiero Hacertelo"
 "Castigo" (featuring Glory)
 "Gata Soltera"
 "Baila Conmigo" (featuring Trebol Clan)
 "Nena"
 "Tu Estas Bailando" (featuring Zion & Lennox)
 "Hot Dog"
 "Muevete Lady" (featuring Noriega)
 "Al Verte Mujer"
 "Tu Cuerpo Me Descontrola" (Trebol Clan song)
 "El Detalle"
 "Al Verte Mujer" (Merengue Remix)
 "Voy Pa' Alla"
 "Monosucesos"

References

2003 albums
Ranking Stone albums